Beauchampia is a monotypic genus of rotifers belonging to the family Flosculariidae. The only species is Beauchampia crucigera.

The species is found in Europe.

References

Flosculariidae
Rotifer genera